Florin Cristian Dan  (born 1 April 1979 in Târgu-Mureș) is a Romanian former footballer who played as a midfielder. Florin Dan played 7 games and scored two goals in CFR Cluj's 2005 Intertoto Cup campaign in which the club reached the final.

Honours
Politehnica Unirea Iași
Divizia C: 2001–02
CFR Cluj
Divizia B: 2003–04
UEFA Intertoto Cup runner-up: 2005
Unirea Alba Iulia
Divizia B: 2008–09

References

External links
 
 
 

1979 births
Living people
Romanian footballers
Association football midfielders
ACF Gloria Bistrița players
FC Olimpia Satu Mare players
FC Politehnica Iași (1945) players
CFR Cluj players
FC Unirea Dej players
CS Corvinul Hunedoara players
ASA 2013 Târgu Mureș players
CS Gaz Metan Mediaș players
CSM Unirea Alba Iulia players
FC UTA Arad players
Liga I players
Liga II players
Liga III players